Aman Gandhi (born 5 May 2000) is a Kenyan cricketer. In September 2019, he was named in Kenya's squad for the 2019 ICC T20 World Cup Qualifier tournament in the United Arab Emirates. Prior to his selection for the 2019 T20 tournament, he was named in Kenya's squad for the 2018 Under-19 Cricket World Cup. He made his Twenty20 International (T20I) debut for Kenya, against Singapore, on 23 October 2019. In November 2019, he was named in Kenya's squad for the Cricket World Cup Challenge League B tournament in Oman.

Gandhi was born to parents of Indian ancestry.

In August 2022, he was named in Kenya's squad for the 2022 Jersey Cricket World Cup Challenge League B tournament. He made his List A debut on 5 August 2022, for Kenya against Hong Kong.

References

External links
 

2000 births
Living people
Kenyan cricketers
Kenya Twenty20 International cricketers
Place of birth missing (living people)
Kenyan people of Indian descent